George Hepburn Robertson (November 22, 1884 – July 3, 1955) was an American racecar driver.  His father ran one of New York's first big garages and Robertson grew up surrounded by Mors, Panhards and other cars.

Career
Robertson raced a Christie, a Hotchkiss, and a Simplex, as well as a Locomobile with which he won the 1908 Vanderbilt Cup.  This victory was the first in the Cup by an American driver in an American car, the legendary "Old No. 16".

For the 1910 Vanderbilt Cup, he was the captain of the Benz team but suffered arm injuries in a crash while showing a newspaper reporter the Long Island course and was forced to retire from driving.

In 1921, he served as Duesenberg's team manager in their victory of the French Grand Prix at Le Mans as Jimmy Murphy drove the first American car to win a Grand Prix held in Europe.

Robertson later became vice president of the Motor Development Corporation and general manager of Roosevelt Raceway, host to the George Vanderbilt-sponsored Cup in 1936 and 1937.

In 1951, racing historian Russ Catlin officially revised AAA records with championship results based on all AAA races from 1902 to 1915 and 1917 to 1919.  This had the effect of changing the 1909 champion from Bert Dingley to George Robertson.

References

General references

External links
Arlington National Cemetery

1884 births
1955 deaths
American racing drivers
Racing drivers from New York City
AAA Championship Car drivers